James Arness (born James King Aurness; May 26, 1923 – June 3, 2011) was an American actor, best known for portraying Marshal Matt Dillon for 20 years in the CBS television series Gunsmoke. Arness has the distinction of having played the role of Dillon in five decades: 1955 to 1975 in the weekly series, then in Gunsmoke: Return to Dodge (1987) and four more made-for-television Gunsmoke films in the 1990s. In Europe, Arness reached cult status for his role as Zeb Macahan in the Western series How the West Was Won.  He was the older brother of actor Peter Graves.

Early life
James Arness was born in Minneapolis. His parents were businessman Rolf Cirkler Aurness and journalist Ruth Duesler. His father's ancestry was Norwegian; his mother's was German. The family name had been Aursnes, but when Rolf's father, Peter Aursnes, emigrated from Norway in 1887, he changed it to Aurness. Arness and his family were Methodists. Arness' younger brother was actor Peter Graves. Peter used the stage name "Graves", a maternal family name.

Arness attended John Burroughs Grade School, Washburn High School, and West High School in Minneapolis. During this time, Arness worked as a courier for a jewelry wholesaler, loading and unloading railway boxcars at the Chicago, Burlington and Quincy Railroad freight yards in Minneapolis, and logging in Pierce, Idaho. Despite "being a poor student and skipping many classes," he graduated from high school in June 1942.

Arness entered Beloit College that fall, where he joined the campus choir and became a member of Beta Theta Pi fraternity.

Military service in World War II
Although Arness wanted to be a naval fighter pilot, he was concerned his poor eyesight would bar him. However, his 6-ft, 7-in (2.01 m) frame ended his chances because the limit for aviators was set at 6 ft, 2 in (1.86 m). He was drafted into the US Army and reported to Fort Snelling in March 1943. As a rifleman, he landed on Anzio Beachhead on January 22, 1944, with the 2nd Platoon, E Company, 2nd Battalion, 7th Infantry Regiment of the 3rd Infantry Division. Arness – due to his height – was the first man to be ordered off his landing craft to determine the depth of the water; it came up to his waist. He was severely wounded in his right leg during the Battle of Anzio, and medically evacuated from Italy to the US, where he was sent to the 91st General Hospital in Clinton, Iowa. His brother Peter (later known as actor Peter Graves) came to see him when he was beginning his long recuperation, assuring him to not worry about his injuries, that likely he could find work in the field of radio.  After undergoing several surgeries, he was honorably discharged from the Army on January 29, 1945. His wounds continued to trouble him, though, throughout the remainder of his life. In his later years, he suffered from chronic leg pain that often became acute, and was sometimes initiated when he was mounted on horses during his performances on Gunsmoke. 

His military decorations included the Bronze Star, the Purple Heart, the American Campaign Medal, the European–African–Middle Eastern Campaign Medal with three bronze battle stars, the World War II Victory Medal, and the Combat Infantryman Badge.

Acting career
[[File:James Arness Gunsmoke 1956.JPG|thumb|left|180px|As Gunsmoke'''s Matt Dillon in 1956]]
After his discharge from the service, Arness began his entertainment career as a radio announcer at Minneapolis station WLOL in 1945.

Determined to find work in films, Arness hitchhiked to Hollywood, where he made the rounds to agencies and casting calls and soon began acting and appearing in films. He made his movie debut at RKO, which immediately changed his name from "Aurness". His film debut was as Loretta Young's (Katie Holstrom) brother, Peter Holstrom, in The Farmer's Daughter. He was credited in The Farmer's Daughter as Aurness.

Though identified with Westerns, Arness also appeared in two science-fiction films, The Thing from Another World (in which he portrayed the titular character) and Them!. He was a close friend of John Wayne and played supporting roles in films starring Wayne titled Big Jim McLain, Hondo, Island in the Sky and The Sea Chase, and starred in Gun the Man Down, a fast-paced Western, for Wayne's company. He also starred in a 1988 TV remake of Wayne's 1948 classic Red River, playing Wayne's role as Tom Dunson.

An urban legend has it that John Wayne was offered the leading role of Matt Dillon in the longtime favorite television show Gunsmoke, but he turned it down, instead recommending James Arness for the role. The only true part of this story is that Wayne did indeed recommend Arness for the part. Wayne introduced Arness in a prologue to the first episode of Gunsmoke, in 1955. The Norwegian-German Arness had to dye his naturally blond hair darker for the role. Arvo Ojala, who taught Arness to shoot, was the first of several actors in the show's opening where Marshal Dillon has a shootout with what is described as "a generic bad guy" representing all those which Dillon must deal with. Gunsmoke made Arness and his co-stars, Milburn Stone, Amanda Blake, Dennis Weaver, Ken Curtis, Burt Reynolds, and Buck Taylor, world-famous, and ran for two decades, becoming the longest-running primetime drama series in US television history by the end of its run in 1976.  The series' season record was tied in 2010 with the final season of Law & Order and tied again in 2018 with season 20 of Law & Order: SVU.  Unlike the latter show, Gunsmoke featured its lead character in each of its 21 seasons; Gunsmoke also aired 179 more episodes, and was in the top 10 in the ratings for 11 more seasons, for a total of 13, including four consecutive seasons at number one.

After Gunsmoke ended, Arness performed in Western-themed movies and television series, including How the West Was Won, and in five made-for-television Gunsmoke movies between 1987 and 1994. An exception was as a big-city police officer in a short-lived 1981–1982 series, McClain's Law, starring with Marshall Colt. His role as mountain man Zeb Macahan in How the West Was Won made him a cult figure in many European countries, where it became even more popular than in the United States, as the series has been rebroadcast many times across Europe.James Arness: An Autobiography was released in September 2001, with a foreword by Burt Reynolds (who had been a cast member of Gunsmoke for several years in the 1960s). Arness noted that he realized, "[I]f I was going to write a book about my life, I better do it now ... 'cause I'm not getting any younger."

Personal life
 
Arness married Virginia Chapman in 1948, and adopted her son Craig (1946 – December 14, 2004). Besides Craig, Arness and Chapman also had a son, Rolf (born February 18, 1952), and a daughter, Jenny Lee Arness (May 23, 1950 – May 12, 1975). Rolf Aurness became World Surfing Champion in 1970. Craig Arness founded the stock photography agency Westlight and also was a photographer for National Geographic. When they divorced in 1963, Arness was granted legal custody of the children. Daughter Jenny died of a drug overdose in 1975. Former wife Virginia died of a drug overdose in 1977.

Four years after his divorce from Virginia Chapman, James Arness met Thordis Brandt, who was his girlfriend for six years before they ended their relationship.

In 1978, Arness married Janet Surtees. She survived him.

Despite his stoic character, according to Ben Bates, his Gunsmoke stunt double, Arness laughed "from his toes to the top of his head".  Shooting on the Gunsmoke set was sometimes suspended because Arness got a case of the uncontrollable giggles. James Arness disdained publicity and banned reporters from the Gunsmoke set. He was said to be a shy and sensitive man who enjoyed poetry, yacht racing, and surfing. TV Guide dubbed him "The Greta Garbo of Dodge City". Buck Taylor (Newly on Gunsmoke) thought so highly of Arness that he named his second son, Matthew, after Arness' character.

Death
Arness died from natural causes at the age of 88 years at his Brentwood home in Los Angeles on June 3, 2011. His body was interred in the Sanctuary of Abiding Hope alcove in the Jasmine Terrace section of the Great Mausoleum at Forest Lawn Memorial Park in Glendale, California.

Awards

For his contributions to the television industry, Arness has a star on the Hollywood Walk of Fame at 1751 Vine Street. In 1981, he was inducted into the Western Performers Hall of Fame at the National Cowboy & Western Heritage Museum in Oklahoma City. Arness was inducted into the Santa Clarita Walk of Western Stars in 2006, and gave a related TV interview.

On the 50th anniversary of television in 1989 in the United States, People magazine chose the "top 25 television stars of all time." Arness was number six. In 1996, TV Guide ranked him number 20 on its "50 Greatest TV Stars of All Time" list.
 
Arness was nominated for these Emmy Awards:
 1957: Best Continuing Performance by an Actor in a Dramatic Series
 1958: Best Continuing Performance by an Actor in a Leading Role in a Dramatic or Comedy Series
 1959: Best Actor in a Leading Role (Continuing Character) in a Dramatic Series

Filmography

FilmsThe Farmer's Daughter (1947) – PeterRoses Are Red (1947) – Ray (credited as "James Aurness")The Man From Texas (1948) – Gang Member (uncredited)Battleground (1949) – GarbyStars In My Crown (1950) – Rolfe Isbell (uncredited)Wagon Master (1950) – Floyd CleggSierra (1950) – Little Sam Coulter (credited as "Jim Arness")In a Lonely Place (1950) – Young Detective (uncredited)Wyoming Mail (1950) – RussellTwo Lost Worlds (1951) – Kirk Hamilton (credited as "James Aurness")Belle Le Grand (1951) – Belle Admirer Mine Guard at Fire (uncredited)The Thing from Another World (1951) – The ThingDouble Crossbones (1951) – Bullock (uncredited)Cavalry Scout (1951) – BarthIron Man (1951) – Alex MallickThe People Against O'Hara (1951) – John Fordman "Johnny" O'HaraCarbine Williams (1952) – Leon WilliamsThe Girl in White (1952) – MattBig Jim McLain (1952) – Mal BaxterHellgate (1952) – George RedfieldHorizons West (1952) – Tiny McGilliganThe Lone Hand (1953) – Gus VardenIsland in the Sky (1953) – Mac McMullenThe Veils of Bagdad (1953) – TargutHondo (1953) – Lennie (Army Indian Scout)Them! (1954) – Robert GrahamHer Twelve Men (1954) – Ralph MunseyMany Rivers to Cross (1955) – Esau HamiltonThe Sea Chase (1955) – SchlieterFlame of the Islands (1955) – Kelly RandThe First Traveling Saleslady (1956) – Joel KingdomGun the Man Down (1956) – Rem AndersonAlias Jesse James (1959) – Marshal Matt Dillon (uncredited)
 
DocumentaryAmerica's Star –  (1988) Documentary and recruiting film for the United States Marshals Service for which Arness was awarded the honorary title of US Marshal and presented with an official badge
TelevisionThe Lone Ranger – Deputy Bud Titus"Gunsmoke was not James Arness' first television western," GunsmokeNet.com (1950)Lux Video Theatre, "The Chase" (1954)Gunsmoke – 635 episodes – Marshal Matt Dillon (1955–1975)Front Row Center (1956)The Red Skelton Chevy Special (1959)The Chevrolet Golden Anniversary Show (1961)A Salute to Television's 25th Anniversary (1972)The Macahans – Zeb Macahan  (1976)How The West Was Won – Zeb Macahan (1977–1979 TV series)McClain's Law – Det. Jim McClain (1981–1982 TV series)The Alamo: 13 Days to Glory (1987, TV movie) – Jim BowieGunsmoke: Return to Dodge (1987, TV movie) – Marshal Matt DillonRed River (1988, TV Movie) – Thomas DunsonJohn Wayne Standing Tall  – TV Movie – Himself /Host (1989)Gunsmoke II: The Last Apache (1990, TV movie) – Marshal Matt DillonGunsmoke: To the Last Man (1992, TV movie) – Marshal Matt DillonGunsmoke IV: The Long Ride (1993, TV movie) – Marshal Matt DillonGunsmoke V: One Man's Justice (1993, TV movie) – Marshal Matt Dillon (final film role)Pioneers of Television'' – episode – Westerns – Himself / Marshal Matt Dillon from Gunsmoke (2011)

References

External links

Comanche Stallion Website
James Arness' Official website
James Arness Television Interview (2006)
 
N.Y. Times Obituary for James Arness

1923 births
2011 deaths
20th-century American male actors
20th-century Methodists
American United Methodists
American male film actors
American male television actors
American people of German descent
American people of Norwegian descent
American shooting survivors
Beloit College alumni
Burials at Forest Lawn Memorial Park (Glendale)
California Republicans
Male actors from Minneapolis
Male actors from Minnesota
Male Western (genre) film actors
Military personnel from Minneapolis
People from Brentwood, Los Angeles
Television producers from California
United States Army personnel of World War II
United States Army non-commissioned officers
Western (genre) television actors